(Maria Helena) Ellen Jolin (16 June 1854 – 25 May 1939) was a Swedish writer, painter and graphic artist.

Biography
Jolin was born  in Stockholm, Sweden. She attended the Royal Swedish Academy of Fine Arts in Stockholm and the Académie Julian in Paris. Her instructors included Fredrik Wilhelm Scholander, Kerstin Cardon, Carl Hansen, and Jules Joseph Lefebvre.

Jolin exhibited her paintings in Paris, Vienna, and Berlin. In 1893 she exhibited her work at the Palace of Fine Arts at the  World's Columbian Exposition in Chicago, Illinois.

She was the aunt of the painter Einar Jolin (1890-1976). Jolin died in 1939 and was buried at Solna Cemetery in Stockholm.

References

External links

 images of Jolin's art on artNET 
 images of Jolin's art on Nationalmuseum

1854 births
1939 deaths
Swedish women painters
19th-century Swedish women artists
20th-century Swedish women artists
19th-century Swedish painters
20th-century Swedish painters